Ange Mlinko (born 19 September 1969 in Philadelphia) is an American poet and critic. The author of six books of poetry, Mlinko was named a Guggenheim Fellow for 2014–15. She teaches poetry at the University of Florida, and is the poetry editor of 'Subtropics. Her most recent book, Venice, was published in April 2022.

Background
Ange Mlinko was born in Philadelphia. Her parents came to the US a few years before she was born. "My father’s family was from Hungary, my mother’s from Belorussia, and they all had passed through Brazil after the Second World War, so intra-family communication happened in Portuguese, and they spoke their hearth language amongst themselves." She earned her BA from St. John's College and MFA from Brown University. She is the author of five books of poetry: Distant Mandate (2017); Marvelous Things Overheard (2013), which was selected by both The New Yorker and the Boston Globe as a best book of 2013; Shoulder Season (2010), a finalist for the William Carlos Williams Award; Starred Wire (2005), which was a National Poetry Series winner in 2004 and a finalist for the James Laughlin Award; and Matinees (1999).

Her poems are about urban life, about language and its failings, about the things we see and do not see. She is often compared to Frank O’Hara. The New Yorker praised her “unique sense of humor and mystery.” John Ashbery said of her collection Starred Wire, “A fine-grained light like that of a nineteenth-century Danish landscape painting shimmers throughout these gorgeously tactile and tactful poems."

Mlinko has published widely as a critic, and her honors and awards include the Randall Jarrell Award in Criticism, the Frederick Bock prize from Poetry magazine for her poem “Cantata for Lynette Roberts,” and a fellowship from the Guggenheim Foundation. Mlinko has worked in Brooklyn, Providence, Boston, and Morocco. She has taught poetry at Brown, the Naropa University Summer Writing Program, Al-Akhawayn University in Ifrane, Morocco, and the University of Houston. She was the poetry editor for The Nation from 2013 to 2016.

Awards
 2004 National Poetry Series winner 
 2005 James Laughlin Award finalist
 2009 Randall Jarrell Award
 "Marvelous Things Overheard" selected by Dan Chiasson as one of The New Yorker's Best Books of 2013
 2014-15 Guggenheim Fellow

 Works 

 Books 

 Immediate Orgy & Audit (Small Pr Distribution, 1996), poetry, 30 pages, 
 Matinées (Zoland Books, 1999), poetry, 55 pages, 
 Starred Wire (Coffee House Press, 2005), poetry, 70 pages, 
 The Children's Museum (Prefontaine Press, 2007), poetry, 18 pages, chapbook in an edition of 162.
 Shoulder Season, (Coffee House Press, 2010), poetry, 82 pages, 
 Marvelous Things Overheard, (Farrar, Straus and Giroux, 2013), poetry, 112 pages, 
 Distant Mandate (Farrar, Straus and Giroux, 2017), poetry, 112 pages, 
 Venice'' (Farrar, Straus and Giroux, 2022), poetry, 144 pages,

Other

References

Citations

Bibliography
 

Living people
Brown University alumni
St. John's College (Annapolis/Santa Fe) alumni
Writers from Philadelphia
American women poets
The Nation (U.S. magazine) people
1969 births
21st-century American women